Bobby Flay's Barbecue Addiction (also known in its fourth season as Barbecue Addiction: Bobby's Basics) is an American cooking television series that aired on Food Network. Presented by chef Bobby Flay, it showcased recipes based upon different outdoor grilling techniques. The series premiered on June 5, 2011, and concluded on September 14, 2014, after four seasons.

In a May 2011 interview with LA Weekly, Flay contrasted Barbecue Addiction with other cooking shows such as Iron Chef, and noted that each episode has a particular theme. In 2012, Bobby Flay's Barbecue Addiction won a Daytime Emmy Award for Outstanding Culinary Program. In April 2013, Flay's book by the same title was published by Crown Publishing imprint Clarkson Potter.

Episodes

Season 1 (2011)

Season 2 (2012)

Season 3 (2013)

Season 4 (2014)

References

External links
 
 
 Rock Shrimp Productions

2010s American cooking television series
2011 American television series debuts
Daytime Emmy Award for Outstanding Culinary Program winners
English-language television shows
Food Network original programming
Food reality television series
Television series by Rock Shrimp Productions